Rubus roribaccus a North American species of brambles in the rose family, called the Lucretia blackberry. It grows in eastern Canada (Québec) and the eastern and central United States (from New York and Massachusetts south to the Carolinas and west as far as Oklahoma, Kansas, and Nebraska).

Rubus roribaccus has a thick stem, round in cross-section and with straight prickles. Leaves are compound with 3 or 5 leaflets. Fruit is black, spherical or slightly oblong.

The genetics of Rubus is extremely complex, so that it is difficult to decide on which groups should be recognized as species. There are many rare species with limited ranges such as this. Further study is suggested to clarify the taxonomy.

References

External links
Photo of herbarium specimen at Missouri Botanical Garden, collected in Missouri in 1932

roribaccus
Plants described in 1890
Flora of Quebec
Flora of the United States